Luciano Xavier Lisboa often called Luciano was born on July 23, 1987 in Paracatu, and is a Brazilian defensive midfielder. He currently plays for Cascavel-PN.

Capped at Under-18 level for Brazil when made part of the team competing at the 2005 Sendai Cup.

Contract
Ituiutaba (Loan) 23 January 2008 to 4 May 2008
Atlético Mineiro 1 July 2004 to 20 June 2009

References

External links
 CBF
 

1987 births
Living people
Brazilian footballers
Association football midfielders
Clube Atlético Mineiro players
Clube de Regatas Brasil players
NK Široki Brijeg players
Expatriate footballers in Bosnia and Herzegovina